Jarrad Grant (born 6 July 1989) is a former professional Australian rules footballer who played for the  and Gold Coast Football Club in the Australian Football League (AFL).

Recruited from his TAC Cup team, the Dandenong Stingrays, Grant is an AIS/AFL Academy graduate who originally played for the Frankston Bombers.

Grant nominated for the 2007 AFL National draft. He was selected by the Bulldogs with their first selection (#5 overall) in the hope that he would add height and marking power to the Bulldogs small forward line.

On 22 February, Grant (who was named as an emergency for the NAB Cup game later that night against the Essendon Football Club) was stung by a stingray. He was later released from hospital but missed the game.

Grant made his AFL debut in round 5 of 2009, but only played the one game, in which he only had one kick, for the year. He returned to the Bulldogs side in round 5 of 2010 and has maintained his position in the side, showing promising signs of becoming a long-term forward-line player including a personal best performance of 6 Goals on Michael Hurley vs Essendon in round 22, 2010.

Grant was delisted in October 2015. He was recruited by Gold Coast in November 2015, before being delisted from the Suns in September 2017.

References

External links

1989 births
Living people
Western Bulldogs players
Australian rules footballers from Victoria (Australia)
Dandenong Stingrays players
Frankston Bombers players
Gold Coast Football Club players
Williamstown Football Club players